Diego Ramón Jiménez Salazar (born Madrid, 27 December 1968), known as El Cigala (Castillan for 'Langoustine'), is a famous Romani Flamenco gypsy singer. As he himself has said, the nickname was given to him by three guitar players, Los Losada, for his powerful voice, not by Camarón de la Isla as commonly believed.

Diego El Cigala also holds Dominican citizenship. 

One of his great albums is the 2003 "Lágrimas Negras", a collaboration with then 85-year-old Cuban pianist Bebo Valdés. The graceful fusion of Cuban rhythms and flamenco vocals made this record an international success.

Born into a family of Romani artists and intellectuals in Madrid, El Cigala started singing in flamenco peñas (enthusiasts' clubs) and tablaos, until his excellent meter and ability to mark the rhythm caught the attention of world-class bailaores like Mario Maya, Faíco, Farruco, El Güito, Manuela Carrasco, Cristóbal Reyes, Carmen Cortés, Joaquín Cortés and he began touring as part of their companies. By the late nineties, having collaborated on recordings by Camarón, Tomatito, Gerardo Núñez and Vicente Amigo, he was ready to record his own CD. With the success of "Undebel" he launched his career as solo singer. He has now recorded 8 CDs and has won two Grammys and 5 Latin Grammy nominations.

In 2010, he voiced Buzz Lightyear (in his Spanish mode) for the European Spanish dub of Toy Story 3, using an Andalusian accent.

His wife, Amparo Fernández, died in 2015 from cancer in Punta Cana.

Discography 
1998 – Undebel
2000 – Entre vareta y Canasta
2001 – Corren tiempos de alegría
2002 – Teatro Real (Live album)
2003 – Lágrimas negras
2003 – Blanco y Negro en vivo (Bebo & Cigala) (Live album)
2005 – Picasso en mis ojos
2008 – Dos lágrimas
2010 – Cigala & Tango (Live album)
2013 – Romance de la luna Tucumana
2013 – Vuelve el flamenco (Live album)
2016 – Indestructible
2020 – Cigala canta a México

References

External links
Official Website
Diego el Cigala biography and discography
Flamenco Forum

1968 births
Living people
Singers from Madrid
Flamenco singers
Latin Grammy Award winners
Romani musicians
Romani singers
Spanish male singers
Spanish Romani people
Spanish expatriates in the Dominican Republic
Naturalized citizens of the Dominican Republic